Esmé is a French given name.

Esme or ESME may also refer to:
 Esmeralda (disambiguation), used as a short form for the feminine name
 Eşme, a town in Turkey
 Esme (damselfly), a genus of damselflies
 "Esmé", a story by Saki
 "Esme", a song on the Joanna Newsom album Have One on Me, and its titular character
 External Short Messaging Entity, in telecommunications
 Eslöv Airport, an airport in Sweden

See also
 ESME-Sudria, a French educational institution